Marc Edward Cavell (June 28, 1939 – February 29, 2004) was an American actor. He performed in eighteen films from 1952 to 1974. Television guest-credits include Peter Gunn, Alfred Hitchcock Presents, Gunsmoke and  The Twilight Zone.

Early Years
Cavell was born Maurice Edward Cavell, the son of Italian immigrant Rudolph Cavell, who had a career as a boxer and wrestler. His father emigrated to the United States from Italy as Rodolfo Cavazzale.

Filmography

References

External links

1939 births
2004 deaths
American male film actors
American male television actors
20th-century American male actors
American people of Italian descent